Namyajamanru is a 2009 Indian Kannada-language drama film directed and written by T. S. Nagabharana. The film stars Vishnuvardhan along with Navya Nair and Vijay Raghavendra. The film was produced by Rajakumari Rajshekar.

The film released on 27 February 2009 to generally positive reviews from critics.

Cast
 Vishnuvardhan as Shashank
 Navya Nair as Charulatha
 Vijay Raghavendra as Alok
 Lakshmi Gopalaswamy as Urmila (Guest Appearance)
 Ananth Nag as Retired Colonel Hoovayya
 Sharath Babu as Dr. Patil 
 Ramesh Bhat as Niranjan
 Mandya Ramesh as DK Boss
 Chitra Shenoy as Pranjali
 Hemanth G Nag as Dinesh 
 Umesh

Soundtrack
The music of the film was composed and lyrics written by Hamsalekha.

Reception

Critical response 

R G Vijayasarathy of Rediff.com scored the film at 3 out of 5 stars and says "Vishnuvardhan's performance is one of the highlights of the film. He has played a character that suits his age and stature. He is brilliant throughout particularly in the climax sequence. Navya Nair is exceptional as the vulnerable yet unpredictable Charu who becomes Urmila because of the disorder. Vijaya Raghavendra has done a good job as Alok. He also renders good play back for the E Hrudaya song. Lakshmi Gopalaswamy shines in the small role, while Anant Nag, Ramesh Bhat fill in their respective roles". A critic from The Times of India scored the film at 3 out of 5 stars and wrote "While it's a pleasing performance by Vishnuvardhan, Navya Nair is at her best and Lakshmi Gopalaswamy, Anant Nag, Vijay Raghavendra excel. Music by Hamsalekha is melodious. Ramesh Babu's camerawork is good". A critic from Sify.com wrote  "Two lovely tunes and lyrics have come from national repute music director Hamsalekha. The cinematography by Ramesh Babu is captured very efficiently. This is worth watching for variety and curiosity elements in it.

References

2009 films
2000s Kannada-language films
Indian drama films
Films scored by Hamsalekha
Films directed by T. S. Nagabharana